The Communications and Digital Committee is a select committee of the House of Lords with the broad remit to "consider the media, digital and creative industries". In recent years, the Committee has held inquiries into the Chairmanship of the BBC, the focus and structure of Government communications with the public and the media, ownership of news media outlets, and the digital television and radio switchovers.

Membership
As of January 2023, the membership of the committee is as follows:

References

Committees of the House of Lords